Torchy Runs for Mayor is a 1939 American drama-comedy film directed by Ray McCarey. It is the eighth film in the Torchy Blane film series by Warner Bros., and the last film starring Glenda Farrell and Barton MacLane as Torchy Blane and Steve McBride. It was released on May 13, 1939. The film is followed by Torchy Blane... Playing with Dynamite (1939).

Plot
Torchy Blane (Glenda Farrell) writes a series of articles criticizing the mayor John Saunders, accusing him of colluding with local crime boss Dr. Jerry Dolan (John Miljan) and Dolan's illegal activities. Torchy is getting all her information straight from the mayor's office, using a listening device. Torchy's boyfriend, detective Steve McBride (Barton MacLane) is concerned about the articles, believing that they are placing her in danger. Dolan asks his allies to withdraw advertising from Torchy's newspaper and pressure her editor into canceling her articles. Torchy is determined to prove that her articles are correct. She overhears Dolan telling the mayor about his "little red book" with all of his transactions and illegal payoffs and finds the book after breaking into Dolan's house. Dolan reports the burglary to police and demands the return of his book.

Torchy writes more articles exposing Dolan, but her story is rejected by her newspaper editor, fearing more syndicates will pull advertising from the paper. She goes to all other newspapers, who all refused to print the story, then she encounters Hubert Ward (Irving Bacon) the publisher of a small and relatively unknown newspaper. Ward decides to print the story and Blane distributes the publication around the city with the help of Gahagan (Tom Kennedy). After Torchy revealed the mayor's corruption, the resultant publicity forces a recall election with the citizens choosing Hubert Ward as the new candidate running against the corrupt mayor.

However, during the election, Ward is murdered by Dolan with a fatal injection. Steve, who is annoyed at Torchy's interference, writes her name as the new candidate as a joke. To his dismay, Torchy decides to run for mayor seriously and is winning voters. Dolan's man kidnaps Torchy and drugs her. Steve threatens Dolan to no avail but found an address where he believes Dolan is keeping Torchy. Steve and Gahagan track down the house and fight Dolan and his men and save Torchy. A half dozen policeman arrived at the house arresting them. Dolan manages to escape in Gahagan's police car but is killed when the car explodes. Torchy wins the election but decides, when presented with a baby to hold for a photograph, that she doesn't want to be the mayor and wants to marry McBride instead.

Cast

Glenda Farrell as Torchy Blane 
Barton MacLane as Steve McBride
Tom Kennedy as Gahagan
John Miljan as Dr. Dolan
Frank Shannon as Captain McTavish
Joe Cunningham as Maxie
George Guhl as Desk Sergeant Graves
Joe Downing as Spuds O'Brien
Irving Bacon as Hubert Ward

Home media
Warner Archive released a boxed set DVD collection featuring all nine Torchy Blane films on March 29, 2011.

References

External links
 

1939 films
1930s crime comedy-drama films
American black-and-white films
American crime comedy-drama films
American detective films
Films about journalists
Films directed by Ray McCarey
Warner Bros. films
Torchy Blane films
1930s English-language films
1930s American films